Jack Norman Rakove (born June 4, 1947) is an American historian, author and professor at Stanford University.  He is a Pulitzer Prize winner.

Biography
Rakove was born in Chicago to Political Science Professor Milton L. Rakove (1918–1983) and his wife, Shirley. The elder Rakove taught at the University of Illinois at Chicago (1957–1983) and Barat College (Lake Forest, Illinois).

Jack Rakove earned his AB in 1968 from Haverford College and his PhD in 1975 from Harvard University. He was also a student at the University of Edinburgh from 1966 to 1967. At Harvard, he was a student of Bernard Bailyn.

Rakove is the W.R. Coe Professor of History and American Studies and professor of political science at Stanford University, where he has taught since 1980. He also taught at Colgate University from 1975 to 1980. He has been a visiting professor at the NYU School of Law.

Rakove won the 1997 Pulitzer Prize for History and the 1998 Cox Book Prize for Original Meanings: Politics and Ideas in the Making of the Constitution (1996) which questioned whether originalism is a comprehensive and exhaustive means of interpreting the Constitution. 
Revolutionaries: A New History of the Invention of America (Houghton Mifflin Harcourt), was a finalist for the George Washington Book Prize. He was elected to the American Philosophical Society in 2007.

Works

 The Beginnings of National Politics: An Interpretive History of the Continental Congress Alfred Knopf, 1979; reprint: Johns Hopkins University Press, 1982, 
 James Madison and the Creation of the American Republic Scott, Foresman/Little, Brown Higher Education, 1990, 
 Original Meanings: Politics and Ideas in the Making of the Constitution A.A. Knopf, 1996, ; reprint: Knopf Doubleday Publishing Group, 2010, 
 Declaring Rights: A Brief History with Documents Bedford/St. Martin's, 1998, 
 Making a Hash of Sovereignty, Part I, The Green Bag (Autumn 1998), pages 35–44
 Making a Hash of Sovereignty, Part II, The Green Bag (Autumn 1999)

 
 Beyond Belief, Beyond Conscience, The Radical Significance of the Free Exercise of Religion. (2020)

References

External links

"Jack Rakove: Faculty Webpage", Stanford University
Alan Pell Crawford, "A Revolution from Below", The Wall Street Journal, May 21, 2010
"Faculty Focus: Jack Rakove,", NYU School of Law, Autumn 2003
The Milton L. Rakove Papers, 1943–1984, University of Illinois at Chicago
Video of discussion/debate with Rakove and Eugene Volokh on Bloggingheads.tv
 
Jack Rakove: Reflections on the Founding Period

1947 births
Living people
Haverford College alumni
Harvard University alumni
Colgate University faculty
New York University faculty
21st-century American historians
21st-century American male writers
Pulitzer Prize for History winners
20th-century American Jews
Stanford University Department of History faculty
Stanford University Department of Political Science faculty
Evanston Township High School alumni
Historians from New York (state)
American male non-fiction writers
21st-century American Jews
Historians from Illinois